JUMP No. 1 is the first studio album by Hey! Say! JUMP, released on July 7, 2010, under the label J Storm.

Information
JUMP No. 1 was released in both limited edition version and a regular edition. The limited edition included a 40-page premium booklet while the Regular Edition included 28-page special booklet. The album contains 17 songs including their previous 5 singles.

Hikaru Yaotome both composed and wrote the song titled "Ai☆Sukuriimu" (アイ☆スクリーム). Kota Yabu, Yuya Takaki, Ryosuke Yamada, Yuto Nakajima, and Yuri Chinen participated in writing lyrics for the new songs. Daiki Arioka arranged one of the songs that Yuya Takaki wrote: "Time". Kei Inoo and Keito Okamoto participated in the studio session for the new songs as musical performers. The lyrics for the song titled "Thank you (Bokutachi kara kimi e)" (Thank You ～僕たちから君へ～, lit. "Thank you: From us to you") were written by Hey! Say! JUMP.

Regular Edition
CD
 "DREAMER"
 "INFINITY"
 "Ultra Music Power"
 "Thank You (Bokutachi Kara Kimi e)"
 
28-page special booklet

Limited Edition
CD
 "DREAMER"
 "INFINITY"
 "Hitomi no Screen"
 "Shinku"
 "Ganbarettsugo!" - Hey! Say! 7
 "Jounetsu JUMP"
 "Smile Song"
 "Memories"
 "Dreams Come True"
 "Time"
 "Score" - Hey! Say! BEST
 "Your Seed"
 "I☆Scream"
 "Mayonaka no Shadow Boy"
 "Dash!!"
 "Ultra Music Power"
 "Thank You (Bokutachi Kara Kimi e)"
 
40-page premium booklet

Charts and certifications

Charts

Sales and certifications

Release

References

External links
 Hey! Say! JUMP
 Johnny's-net

2010 debut albums
Hey! Say! JUMP albums